The American fraternity Alpha Kappa Psi has established over 350 "chapters" (local sections) in universities and colleges all over the United States and elsewhere, in addition to about 90 chapters of alumni in American cities and a small number of colonies. The majority of the chapters remain active. The names of the college chapters consist of either one or two Greek letters.

Naming convention
Chapters of Alpha Kappa Psi are given names consisting of either one or two Greek letters. The names are issued in order according to the dates on which the chapters are chartered. Alpha is the name given to the founding chapter at New York University, followed by Beta at the University of Denver for the second chapter, then Gamma, and so on. Once the Greek alphabet had been exhausted by using single letters, two-letter names began to be issued, starting with Alpha Beta, then Alpha Gamma, then Alpha Delta, etc.

In the first cycle of chapter naming, no two-letter chapter name consists of identical Greek letters, and letters that came before the first letter of a chapter's name in the Greek alphabet were not used for the second letter. Thus, after Alpha Omega the next name issued was Beta Gamma to Indiana University, not Beta Alpha or Beta Beta. Likewise, after Beta Omega, the next name issued was Gamma Delta; Gamma Alpha, Gamma Beta, and Gamma Gamma were not used. Using this system, 300 names could be issued to college chapters, ending in 2005 with Psi Omega at Santa Clara University. Beginning that year, the Fraternity began to issue the unused two-letter names in reverse order.  As with the first naming cycle, no two-letter chapter name consisting of identical Greek letters would be issued. Thus, the next charter issued after Psi Omega was to Omega Psi. Omega Omega was not used.

Chapters with houses
Chapter houses were at one time common in the fraternity.  The need for housing and private meeting space can be traced back to Alpha Chapter, where a committee chaired by George W. Myer, Jr. was charged in 1905 with the task of securing a meeting-room near the School of Commerce at NYU.  In the fall of that same year, the chapter began to meet in a room at 28 East 11th Street, at a weekly rental of $1. When the Class of 1906 graduated the following June, the chapter had to move. Another committee was appointed to seek a new location for the new semester, and in October 1906, the chapter approved the rental of two rooms and bath at the Benedict, 80 Washington Square East, at $31.25 a month. The chapter would remain at the new location for four years.  In fall 1907, the chapter expanded to two additional rooms at the Benedict for $51.50 a month.  With conditions becoming crowded at the Benedict, Alpha obtained its first official chapter house on October 24, 1910, located at 113 Waverly Place, New York, New York.

A select number of chapters still have actual houses on college campuses.  These chapters include:
Florida State University (Beta Psi)
Michigan State University (Gamma Mu)
Pennsylvania State University (Gamma Epsilon)
Tennessee Technological University (Zeta Upsilon)
University of Georgia (Alpha Epsilon)
University of Minnesota (Alpha Eta)
University of Southern California (Alpha Zeta)
Central Michigan University (Zeta Xi)
Western Michigan University (Gamma Tau)

Chapter facts and statistics
Chapter of the Year
 2016-2017 - Alpha Chi - Emory University
 2015-2016 - Mu Sigma - San Diego State University
 2013-2014 - Beta Xi - Virginia Tech
 2011-2012 - Gamma Iota - Loyola University Chicago
 2010-2011 - Omega Theta - University of Maryland, College Park
 2009-2010 - Theta - Oregon State University
 2008-2009 - Omega Theta - University of Maryland, College Park
 2007-2008 - Xi Omega - University of South Florida
 2006-2007 - Alpha Gamma - University of Virginia
 2005-2006 - Beta Xi - Virginia Tech
 2004-2005 - Omicron Tau - Rutgers University
 2003-2004 - Alpha Beta - University of California, Berkeley

Chapters with more than 135 student members as of 2013
 214 - Zeta Lambda - Haslam College of Business, University of Tennessee
 203 - Alpha Phi - Warrington College of Business Administration, University of Florida
 171 - Upsilon - Trulaske College of Business, University of Missouri
 159 - Beta Psi - College of Business, Florida State University
 157 - Gamma Chi - Farmer School of Business, Miami University
 157 - Beta Gamma - Kelley School of Business, Indiana University
 153 - Alpha Mu - Wisconsin School of Business, University of Wisconsin–Madison
 153 - Alpha Nu - Eller College of Management, University of Arizona
 140 - Pi Chi - Freeman School of Business, Tulane University
 138 - Alpha Epsilon - Terry College of Business, University of Georgia
 158 - Rho Tau - School of Business Administration, University of Mississippi

List of college chapters
Please note:
Many Universities and Colleges with chapters have undergone name changes since charters were granted. The most current University name is used.
An asterisk (*) indicates that Universities and/or Colleges have merged. Duplicate entries in this list are not errors!

List of college colonies

List of alumni chapters

 The charters from the Michigan, Detroit, and Wayne alumni chapters were suspended in order to facilitate the installation of the combined Motor City Alumni Chapter in 1959.

References

Alpha Kappa Psi
chapters